Pouteria malaccensis is a tree in the family Sapotaceae. The flowers are greenish-white and fragrant. The tree is named after Malacca in Peninsular Malaysia. The timber is used locally in furniture-making. Habitat is forests from sea-level to  altitude. P. malaccensis is found in Thailand, Sumatra, Peninsular Malaysia, Borneo, Sulawesi and New Guinea.

References

malaccensis
Plants described in 1942
Trees of Thailand
Trees of Malesia
Trees of New Guinea